Moray Grant (1917–1977) was a Scottish cinematographer. Born 13 November 1917, near Forres, Morayshire. 
Full name Robert David Moray Grant. Married Antoinette Christiansen, oldest daughter of Arthur Chritiansen, editor of the Daily Express, in March 1951, in Kensington, London. One daughter.

Selected filmography
 The Trojan Brothers (1946)
 Counterblast (1948)
 The Three Weird Sisters (1948)
 The Jack of Diamonds (1949)
 Night Was Our Friend (1951)
 The Dark Light (1951)
 Conflict of Wings (1954)
 Up the Creek (1958)
 The Vampire Lovers (1970)
 I, Monster (1971)
 An Appointment in London (1952)

References

External links
 

1917 births
1977 deaths
Scottish cinematographers
People from Moray